Rizzo v. Goode, 423 U.S. 362 (1976), was a United States Supreme Court case in which the Court held that a prophylactic injunction against non-culpable state executive officials was an overbroad interference by the Federal Courts in the state executive branches. In doing so, the court created a limit on the federal injunctive power in matters of state agency internal affairs.

Background

In the United States District Court for the Eastern District of Pennsylvania, plaintiffs sued a number of Philadelphia officials in a § 1983 suit, charging that the police department had engaged in a "pervasive pattern of illegal and unconstitutional mistreatment by police officers." John P. Fullam ordered the defendants, who were supervisors of the Philadelphia Police Department, to submit a "comprehensive program" for the Court's approval, in order to effectively deal with civilian complaints. The decision was subsequently affirmed by the United States Court of Appeals for the Third Circuit.

At the Supreme Court
In a 5-3 ruling, the Supreme Court reversed the Court of Appeal ruling, holding that the case or controversy Article III requirement was lacking, and the lower courts had exceeded their authority under . In discussing the latter, Justice Rehnquist (as he then was) explained that:

Important principles of federalism militate against the proposition that federal equity power should fashion prophylactic procedures designed to minimize misconduct by a handful of state employees.

The Supreme Court cast the case as "a heated dispute between individual citizens and certain policemen ... [that] has evolved into an attempt by the federal judiciary to resolve a 'controversy' between the entire citizenry of Philadelphia and the petitioning elected and appointed officials over what steps might, in the Court of Appeals' words, '[appear] to have the potential for prevention of future police misconduct.'" The court - "express[ing] grave doubts about the justiciability" of the case - held that "the individual respondents' claim to 'real and immediate' injury rests not upon what the named petitioners might do to them in the future -- such as set a bond on the basis of race -- but upon what one of a small, unnamed minority of policemen might do to them in the future because of that unknown policeman's perception of departmental disciplinary procedures. This hypothesis is even more attenuated than those allegations of future injury found insufficient in O'Shea to warrant invocation of federal jurisdiction. Thus, insofar as the individual respondents were concerned, we think they lacked [standing]."

Moreover, "appropriate consideration must be given to principles of federalism in determining the availability and scope of equitable relief," the court said; "[w]here, as here, the exercise of authority by state officials is attacked, federal courts must be constantly mindful of the "special delicacy of the adjustment to be preserved between federal equitable power and State administration of its own law." In such a setting, "principles of equity ... militate heavily against the grant of an injunction except in the most extraordinary circumstances."

Aftermath
In 1978, the High Court declared in Monell v. Department of Social Services of the City of New York that Rizzo "decided that the mere right to control, without any control or direction having been exercised and without any failure to supervise, is not enough to support § 1983 liability." When read together, the two cases support the proposition that §1983 supervisory liability cannot be based on respondeat superior.

Rizzo was cited in the later Supreme Court ruling in Pennhurst State School and Hospital v. Halderman, a significant case in United States constitutional law which held that state officials enjoy immunity from suit on the basis of state law claims in federal court. Rizzo'''s use of the doctrine of equitable restraint, as used in Pennhurst, has been questioned as to whether it can be justified.

See alsoThe Thin Blue Lie''

Further reading

Notes

References

External links
 

United States Supreme Court cases
1976 in United States case law
United States Supreme Court cases of the Burger Court
Law enforcement scandals
Police brutality in the United States
African-American history in Philadelphia
Philadelphia Police Department
Torture in the United States